Elections to Blackburn with Darwen Borough Council were held in 2008 on 1 May along with all other local elections in the UK.

Election result
The party tallies before the 2008 poll were different from the results from the 2007 election. Arif Waghat was sacked from the Liberal Democrats in August 2007 and Michael Johnson quit For Darwen in March 2008. Both are continuing as independents.

In this first summary, "seats" represent the number of wards each party are defending.

This summary shows the picture for the whole council.

|-
!colspan=2|Parties
!Seats
!Previous
!NetGain/Loss
|-
| 
| ||31||
|-
| 
| ||17||
|-
| 
| ||11||
|-
| 
| ||3||
|-
|
|align=left|Independent
| ||2||
|-
|
!colspan=2|Total!!64!!64
|}

Wards

Audley
Previously won by ? in 200? with a majority of ?

Bastwell
Previously won by ? in 200? with a majority of ?

Beardwood with Lammack
Previously won by ? in 200? with a majority of ?

Corporation Park
Previously won by Labour in 2007 with a majority of 305.

Earcroft
Previously won by ? in 200? with a majority of ?

Ewood
Previously won by ? in 200? with a majority of ?

Fernhurst
Previously won by ? in 200? with a majority of ?

Higher Croft
Previously won by ? in 200? with a majority of ?

Little Harwood
Previously won by ? in 200? with a majority of ?

Livesey with Pleasington
Previously won by ? in 200? with a majority of ?

Marsh House
Previously won by ? in 200? with a majority of ?

Meadowhead
Previously won by ? in 200? with a majority of ?

Mill Hill
Previously won by ? in 200? with a majority of ?

North Turton with Tockholes
Previously won by ? in 200? with a majority of ?

Queen's Park
Previously won by ? in 200? with a majority of ?

Roe Lee
Previously won by ? in 200? with a majority of ?

Shadsworth with Whitebirk
Previously won by ? in 200? with a majority of ?

Shear Brow
Previously won by ? in 200? with a majority of ?

Sudell
Previously won by ? in 200? with a majority of ?

Sunnyhurst
Previously won by ? in 200? with a majority of ?

Wensley Fold
Previously won by ? in 200? with a majority of ?

Whitehall
Previously won by ? in 200? with a majority of ?

2008 English local elections
2008
2000s in Lancashire